Kvemo Kartli or "Lower Kartli", is a historic province and current administrative region (mkhare) in southeastern Georgia. The city of Rustavi is the regional capital.

Location
Kvemo Kartli is a region located in the Southeastern part of Georgia. It borders  Tbilisi, Shida Kartli, and Mtskheta-Mtianeti on the north; Samtskhe–Javakheti on the west; Kakheti on the east; and the countries of Armenia and Azerbaijan on the south.

General information
The region is one of the most economically developed in Georgia. After Tbilisi, the region is ranked second in industrial production. The area of the region is of 6528 km squares, which accounts for 10% of the Georgian territory; and it is the fourth largest region by area. The region is the third most populated region in Georgia with a population of 434,000. The administrative center is Rustavi. There are 353 populated areas, including:

 7 cities: Rustavi, Bolnisi, Gardabani, Dmanisi, Tetritsqaro, Marneuli and Tsalka
 6 "daba": Kazreti, Manglisi, Tamarisi, Shaumiani, Bediani and Trialeti
 338 villages

Demographics
In 2014, Kvemo Kartli province of Georgia had the following ethnic makeup of 423,986 total population:

 Georgians – 217,305 (51.25%)
 Azerbaijanis – 177,032 (41.75%)
 Armenians – 21,500 (5.07%)
 Greeks – 2,631 (0.62%)
 Russians – 2,113 (0.49%)

The population estimate in 2012 was 511,300, but the 2014 census shows it now reduced to about 424,000.

The ethnic Georgians live mostly in northern part of the region and comprise the majority in the municipalities of Tetritsqaro, Gardabani Municipality, Tsalka and in Rustavi. The Azerbaijanis live in the southern part and comprise for the majority in the municipalities of Marneuli, Dmanisi and Bolnisi. The ethnic Armenians and Greeks mostly live in the Tsalka Municipality.

Religions
According to 2014 census, 51.4% of the population identifies as Orthodox Christians, mostly Georgians, Russians and Greeks; 42.9% are Muslims, mostly Azerbaijanis; 3.3% are Armenian Christians and 0.2% are irreligious.

Administrative divisions 

Kvemo Kartli is divided into 6 municipalities and 1 special status city, Rustavi:

Economy
Owing to its location, the region has great transport links. There passes the railway and the motorways which link Georgia with its neighbours Armenia and Azerbaijan. The main industries are located in Rustavi and Marneuli. The industrial production of Kvemo Kartlo comprises 20% of the global Georgian production.

Monuments
Kvemo Kartli inherited a lot of historical monuments such as the Bolnisi Sioni, the Pitareti Monastery, Birtvisi, Samshvilde and the old inhabited area near Dmanisi

References

External links 
 
 Kartli Portal
 Result of population census 2002 in Georgia

 
Regions of Georgia (country)
Former provinces of Georgia (country)